Abu Hatim al-Zutti was an Isma'ili preacher who was the founder of the Baqliyya sub-sect of Qarmatians.

Biography 
Abu Hatim al-Zutti was of Zutt origin, a group of people who had migrated from northwestern parts of the Indian subcontinent to Iraq. He started propagating his faith in 907 in lower Iraq, prohibiting his followers from eating garlic, leeks, and turnips, slaughtering animals, and following certain customary Islamic religious observances. Due to these restrictions, they came to be known as "the Greengrocers" (al-Baqliyyah), and this label was soon used to generally refer to the  Qarmatians of the Sawad.

References

Qarmatians

10th-century people